or Naintiin is a 1987 Japanese science fiction film directed by Kensho Yamashita.  It was produced by Toho Company, Limited.  This is a teen idol film.

Footnotes

External links
Nineteen on IMDb

1987 films
1980s science fiction films
1987 fantasy films
1980s Japanese-language films
Japanese science fiction films
Toho films
1980s Japanese films